Dezeen is an online architecture, interiors and design magazine based in London, with offices in Hoxton and also previously in New York City.

History 
Dezeen was launched in London by Marcus Fairs at the end of November 2006. Its New York City office launched in 2015, with editors based in Manhattan and then Brooklyn, before closing in fall 2020.

Starting from 2018, the magazine launched annual Dezeen Awards honouring achievements in the best architecture, interiors and design around the world.

In March 2021, Dezeen was acquired by Danish media company JP/Politiken Media Group. Dezeen was JP/Politikens Hus’ first acquisition outside Scandinavia. The acquisition was part of JP/Politikens Hus’ 2025 strategy to increase revenue from DKK 3bn to 5bn. At the time of the acquisition, the site had more than 3 million unique monthly visitors and more than 6.5 million social media followers.

Marcus Fairs (1967–2022), Dezeen founder, CEO and editor-in-chief died on June 30th 2022. Obituaries were written for Fairs in many publications, including The Times of London, and Domus Magazine.

Reception
Dezeen was named the best architecture blog by The Independent newspaper in 2012, and The Times newspaper included the magazine in its list of the "50 top websites you can't live without" in 2013. Dezeen was also included in Time magazine's "Design 100" list of the "most influential forces in global design".

See also 

 Murray Moss
 Designboom
 Architectural Digest
 Archdaily

References

External links

 

Architecture websites
Visual arts magazines published in the United Kingdom
Online magazines published in the United Kingdom
Design magazines
Magazines established in 2006
Magazines published in London
2006 establishments in England